{{Infobox horseraces
|class         = Listed
|horse race    = Nottinghamshire Oaks
|image         =
|caption       =
|location      = Nottingham RacecourseNottingham, England
|inaugurated   = 2006
|race type     = Flat / Thoroughbred
|sponsor       = British EBF
|website       = Nottingham
|distance      = 1m 2f 50y (2,057 m)
|surface       = Turf
|track         = Left-handed
|qualification = Four-years-old and upfillies and maresExcl Group 1 winners after 31 August 2020
|weight        = 9 st 0 lb<small>Penalties8 lb for Group 2 winners*5 lb for Group 3 winner*3 lb for Listed winners**since 31 August 2020</small>
|purse         = £37,750 (2021)1st: £21,408
}}

|}

The Nottinghamshire Oaks is a Listed flat horse race in Great Britain open to mares and fillies aged four years or older.
It is run at Nottingham over a distance of 1 mile 2 furlongs and 50 yards (2,057 metres), and it is scheduled to take place each year in late April.

The race was run as the Warwickshire Oaks'' at Warwick over 11 furlongs between 2006 and 2013.
It was run at Nottingham in 2014 after a horse had been killed in an accident at a Warwick flat meeting in May.
The race was moved permanently, and renamed, from 2015 after Warwick had closed for flat racing. Prior to 2021 the race was run in late May or early June.

Records
Most successful horse:
 no horse has won this race more than once

Leading jockey (3 wins):
 Jamie Spencer – Power Girl (2006), Set To Music (2012), Secret Gesture (2014)

Leading trainer (2 wins):
 Michael Stoute -  Sun Maiden (2019), Noon Star (2022)

Winners

See also 
Horse racing in Great Britain
List of British flat horse races

References

Racing Post:

Middle distance horse races for fillies and mares
Nottingham Racecourse
Flat races in Great Britain